Progress 20 was a Soviet uncrewed Progress cargo spacecraft, which was launched in April 1984 to resupply the Salyut 7 space station.

Spacecraft
Progress 20 was a Progress 7K-TG spacecraft. The 20th of forty three to be launched, it had the serial number 121. The Progress 7K-TG spacecraft was the first generation Progress, derived from the Soyuz 7K-T and intended for uncrewed logistics missions to space stations in support of the Salyut programme. On some missions the spacecraft were also used to adjust the orbit of the space station.

The spacecraft were powered by chemical batteries, and could operate in free flight for up to three days, remaining docked to the station for up to thirty.

Launch
Progress 20 launched on 15 April 1984 from the Baikonur Cosmodrome in the Kazakh SSR. It used a Soyuz-U2 rocket.

Docking
Progress 20 docked with the aft port of Salyut 7 on 17 April 1984 at 09:22 UTC, and was undocked on 6 May 1984 at 17:46 UTC.

Decay
It remained in orbit until 7 May 1984, when it was deorbited. The deorbit burn occurred at 00:32:51 UTC, with the mission ending at around 01:15 UTC.

See also

 1984 in spaceflight
 List of Progress missions
 List of uncrewed spaceflights to Salyut space stations

References

Progress (spacecraft) missions
1984 in the Soviet Union
Spacecraft launched in 1984
Spacecraft which reentered in 1984
Spacecraft launched by Soyuz-U rockets